Narra ناڑا) is a village and union council of Jand Tehsil in Attock District of Punjab Province, Pakistan. It is located at 117 kilometers from country's capital, Islamabad.

Narra situated five kilometres from the Indus River (دریائے سندھ) on the border between the Punjab and Khyber Pakhtunkhwa provinces of Pakistan.

Gallery

References

Villages in Attock District
Union councils of Attock District